College of Education, Ekiadolor is a defunct government owned College of Education located in Edo State, Southern part of Nigeria. The institution was established in 1980 under the administration of Professor Ambrose Folorunsho Alli of the defunct Bendel State. The College was one of the government approved tertiary institutions in Nigeria. The institution served as a Centre for training of School Teachers in Nigeria. The College of Education awards National Certificates in Education (NCE) to its graduates. NCE is a mandatory requirement for those who want to work as a teacher in a Nigerian school. The college was one of the three tertiary Colleges in Edo State, with the other two being College of Education, Igueben and College of Agriculture, Iguoriakhi.

College Upgrade and Tayo Akpata University of Education Controversy 
In 2015, the College of Education, Ekiadolor was closed down by the then Governor of Edo State, Comrade Adams A. Oshiomhole, with plans to upgrade the college to a University of Education. It was proposed that the College of Education will be upgraded to Tayo Akpata University of Education, Ekiadolor. However, the plan never materialized. This led to series to protests by the indigenes of Ekiadolor and neighboring communities for the restoration of the institution to its original state as a College of Education.

Establishment of Federal College of Education, Ekiadolor 
In 2020, the Federal Government of Nigeria, through the Minister of Education, announced plans to establish six new Federal Colleges of Education in Nigeria. One of the six Federal Colleges of Education was set up using the facilities of Tayo Akpata University of Education in Ekiadolor.

References 

Universities and colleges in Nigeria
1980 establishments in Nigeria
Educational institutions established in 1980